The Castle Gardens Petroglyph Site is a  by  region of vertical cliff faces in Fremont County, Wyoming, United States, with extensive petroglyph images incised in the rock faces. The glyphs include images of water turtles and circular shields, as well as human and animal figures. The figures with circular shields are particular to the area, and are known as Castle Gardens Shield style images. A consensus of researchers is that the figures were carved by Athabaskans related to the Navajo and Apache, some time between 1000 AD and 1250 AD. The site is being developed by the Bureau of Land Management, and may be visited.

The site was placed on the National Register of Historic Places on April 16, 1969.

See also

 National Register of Historic Places listings in Fremont County, Wyoming

References

External links

 Castle Gardens Petroglyphs at the Bureau of Land Management
 Castle Gardens Petroglyphs at the Wyoming State Historic Preservation Office
 Castle Gardens at Wyoming History

		

National Register of Historic Places in Fremont County, Wyoming
Archaeological sites on the National Register of Historic Places in Wyoming